Living It Up is a 1954 comedy film starring Dean Martin and Jerry Lewis.

Living It Up or Livin' It Up may also refer to:

Film and television 
 Living It Up (1966 film), a French-German film
 Living It Up (2000 film), a Spanish film
 Living It Up (British TV series), a 1957-1958 sitcom
 Living It Up (Philippine TV program), a 2007 lifestyle show
 Living It Up! with Ali & Jack, a 2003-2004 American syndicated daytime talk show

Music

Albums 
 Livin' It Up!, by Sammy Hagar and The Waboritas, 2006
 Livin' It Up (album), by George Strait, 1990
 Living It Up, by Bert Kaempfert, or the title song, 1963
 Livin' It Up!, by Jimmy Smith, 1968

Songs 
 ""Livin' It Up" (Ciara song), 2013
 ""Livin' It Up" (Ja Rule song), 2001
 ""Livin' It Up" (Northern Uproar song), 1996
 ""Living It Up" (Stakka Bo song), 1993
 "The Sun Goes Down (Living It Up)", by Level 42, 1983
 "Livin' It Up", by Limp Bizkit from Chocolate Starfish and the Hot Dog Flavored Water, 2000
 "Living It Up", by Rickie Lee Jones from Pirates, 1981
 "Living It Up", by People!, 1969
 "Livin It Up", by Young Thug featuring Post Malone and ASAP Rocky from Punk, 2021
 "Livin' It Up", by Hieroglyphics from The Kitchen, 2013

Other uses 
 Living It Up: Humorous Adventures in Hyperdomesticity, a 1996 book by Karen Finley
 Livin' It Up with The Bratz, a 2006 interactive DVD in the Bratz franchise

See also 
 Live It Up (disambiguation)